Vatica latiffii is a species of tree in the family Dipterocarpaceae. It is endemic to Sarawak on Borneo.

It is a Critically endangered species threatened by habitat loss.

References

latiffii
Endemic flora of Borneo
Trees of Borneo
Plants described in 2015